Nuno Ricardo de Oliveira Ribeiro  (born 11 November 1977), known as Maniche, is a Portuguese retired professional footballer who played as a central midfielder.

He played top flight football in Portugal, Russia, England, Spain, Italy and Germany, and in 2004 he helped Porto win the Champions League, one of eight trophies conquered with that club. He amassed Primeira Liga totals of 177 matches and 31 goals, during seven seasons. He also experienced success abroad, winning the Serie A with Inter Milan.

Maniche won 52 caps for Portugal, representing the nation at Euro 2004 and the 2006 World Cup and finishing runner-up in the former competition.

Club career

Portugal
Born in Lisbon, Maniche played youth football for local S.L. Benfica. After three seasons with neighbouring F.C. Alverca, who acted as the former's farm team, he returned to Benfica, where he initially played as a winger.

Following disciplinary problems at Benfica, Maniche was signed by José Mourinho for FC Porto. The manager made him a key member of his sides, reconverting him to central midfielder.

Maniche enjoyed a successful period at Porto, winning both the UEFA Cup in 2003 and the UEFA Champions League in 2004 and contributing with 13 goals in 60 matches as the club also managed back-to-back Primeira Liga titles. He was chosen Man of the match in the 2004 Intercontinental Cup, which his team won on penalties against Once Caldas of Colombia.

Abroad
Maniche was sold to FC Dynamo Moscow in May 2005, for €16 million. He was accompanied in that adventure by Porto teammates Giourkas Seitaridis and Costinha (another club player, Derlei, had left for the Russian team in January). Unsettled, as were the vast majority of foreign players bought by new owner Alexey Fedorychev, he left in January 2006 on loan to Premier League side Chelsea.

Maniche was part of Chelsea's 2006 league-winning squad. In his first start, a home game against West Ham United on 9 April, he had an opportunity to score an equaliser from six yards out but smashed his shot against the crossbar, and was shown an immediate red card in the 17th minute for a challenge on Lionel Scaloni; nevertheless, they went on to win it 4–1.

However, Maniche did not make enough appearances in the league to earn a winners' medal, challenged for a central midfield place by Michael Essien, Frank Lampard and Claude Makélélé. Chelsea had the option of making the transfer permanent at the end of the season, for £5 million (US$9 million), but the player eventually returned to Dynamo Moscow.

Maniche was signed by Atlético Madrid in late August 2006. Partnering countrymen Costinha and Zé Castro, he scored four goals in 28 La Liga matches in his first season as the capital team finished seventh.

Following a run-in with Atlético coach, Javier Aguirre, Maniche was cut from the squad, and agreed to join Inter Milan on a January loan, running for the second part of 2007–08. Splitting time between the bench and the first eleven in eight Serie A appearances, he managed to score one goal, in a 22 March 2008, 1–2 home defeat against Juventus FC, also hitting the post in stoppage time.

In July 2008, Maniche returned to Atlético Madrid, playing a major part in the Colchoneros early season, as the club had returned to the UEFA Champions League after a 12-year absence. In late February 2009, however, he was ousted after a new quarrel with the management, now led by former club player Abel Resino.

According to additional reports in the Spanish press, Maniche was deemed surplus to requirements in Madrid after he rejected the club's offer of a new deal, as his contract was going to expire on 30 June 2009.

"We informed Maniche three or four weeks ago that we wanted to renew his contract" said Atlético's general manager Miguel Ángel Gil Marín."

"We really wanted him to accept the conditions and sign the contract. It is a shame for us."

 
Maniche was released from contract on 6 May, even before the season was over, being left available to sign for any club, with a return to Porto one of the possible destinations.

On 20 July 2009, Maniche moved to the Bundesliga with 1. FC Köln, signing a two-year deal and rejoining former Benfica and Portugal teammate Petit.

Return to Portugal
Maniche left after only one season in Germany and, on 16 June 2010, returned to his native country, signing a one-year deal (plus an option for two further seasons) with the club he still had not represented in the Portuguese Big Three, Sporting CP. Frequently injured during his spell with the Lions and vastly underperforming, the 33-year-old terminated his contract by mutual consent – even though he had automatically renewed it in December after appearing in his 20th competitive game– on 6 July 2011; in May of the following year, not being able to find a new team, he decided to retire.

On 12 June 2013, Maniche was appointed as assistant at Paços de Ferreira after his former Porto and international teammate Costinha was hired as the manager. Three years later he was hired in the same role alongside the same boss at Segunda Liga side Académica de Coimbra, but left after four months due to personal reasons.

International career
 
Maniche made his debut for the Portugal national team on 29 March 2003, in a 2–1 friendly victory over Brazil. He was a key element in the country's runner-up run at UEFA Euro 2004, scoring in a 2–0 group stage win against Russia and adding another in the semi-finals against the Netherlands, which ended in a 2–1 victory; he was subsequently selected for the Team of the Tournament.

On 21 June 2006, in the 2006 FIFA World Cup, Portugal played Mexico, in the nation's final group game. Maniche netted in the sixth minute in an eventual 2–1 triumph that sealed the group win. Four days later, in the round-of-16, as the national side faced the Netherlands once again, he scored the only goal in the game, and was the only Portuguese player to feature on Adidas' Golden Ball shortlist.

After appearing significantly during the qualifying stages for Euro 2008, he was surprisingly left out of the nation's final squad, although younger brother Jorge Ribeiro would make the final cut. He also featured little during the qualification for the 2010 World Cup, and was subsequently left out of the squad for the final stages by manager Carlos Queiroz.

Style of play
Known for his teamwork, stamina and powerful shot, Maniche received his nickname after Benfica's 1980s Danish forward Michael Manniche.

Personal life
Jorge Ribeiro, Maniche's younger brother, was also a footballer. Mainly a left midfielder, he also represented Benfica amongst many other clubs, and the two were teammates at Dynamo Moscow.

Career statistics

Club

International

Scores and results list Portugal's goal tally first, score column indicates score after each Maniche goal.

HonoursPortoPrimeira Liga: 2002–03, 2003–04
Taça de Portugal: 2002–03
Supertaça Cândido de Oliveira: 2003
UEFA Champions League: 2003–04
UEFA Cup: 2002–03
Intercontinental Cup: 2004Inter MilanSerie A: 2007–08PortugalUEFA European Championship runner-up: 2004IndividualFIFA World Cup All-Star Team: 2006
UEFA European Championship Team of the Tournament: 2004
UEFA Team of the Year: 2004
Intercontinental Cup Man of the Match: 2004Orders'
 Medal of Merit, Order of the Immaculate Conception of Vila Viçosa (House of Braganza)

References

External links

PortuGOAL profile

1977 births
Living people
Footballers from Lisbon
Portuguese footballers
Association football midfielders
Primeira Liga players
Liga Portugal 2 players
S.L. Benfica footballers
F.C. Alverca players
FC Porto players
Sporting CP footballers
Russian Premier League players
FC Dynamo Moscow players
Premier League players
Chelsea F.C. players
Serie A players
Inter Milan players
La Liga players
Atlético Madrid footballers
Bundesliga players
1. FC Köln players
UEFA Champions League winning players
UEFA Cup winning players
Portugal youth international footballers
Portugal under-21 international footballers
Portugal international footballers
UEFA Euro 2004 players
2006 FIFA World Cup players
Portuguese expatriate footballers
Expatriate footballers in Russia
Expatriate footballers in England
Expatriate footballers in Spain
Expatriate footballers in Italy
Expatriate footballers in Germany
Portuguese expatriate sportspeople in Russia
Portuguese expatriate sportspeople in Italy
Portuguese expatriate sportspeople in Spain
Portuguese expatriate sportspeople in Germany
Portuguese expatriate sportspeople in England